Earl Rivers was an English title, which has been created three times in the Peerage of England. It was held in succession by the families of Woodville (or Wydeville), Darcy and Savage.

History
The first creation was made for Richard Woodville, 1st Baron Rivers, in 1466 and remained in this family until 1491. As borne by the Woodvilles the title was not derived from the name of a place, but from an ancient family name, Redvers, or Reviers, members of this family, whose arms are quartered on the Rivers shield, having been sometime Earls of Devon.

The second creation was made in 1626 for Thomas Darcy, 1st Viscount Colchester, who had succeeded as 3rd Baron Darcy of Chiche (created in 1551). In 1613, a reversion of the barony was granted to Sir Thomas Savage, Bt (created Viscount Savage in 1626 and son-in-law of Darcy); this creation and the earldom both had a remainder to Darcy's heirs male of his body, with remainder to Savage and the heirs male of his body. Savage's son John succeeded to the Savage baronetcy and viscountcy in 1635. In 1640 on the death of the 1st Earl, John succeeded to the 1613 reversion of the Darcy of Chiche barony, the Colchester viscountcy and the Rivers earldom; the 1551 creation of the Darcy of Chiche barony became extinct. The earldom and the subsidiary titles became extinct when John Savage, 5th Earl Rivers, died in 1737.

Elizabeth, Viscountess Savage, wife of Thomas, 1st Viscount Savage, daughter of the 1st Earl Rivers and mother of the 2nd Earl, was created Countess Rivers in her own right in 1641. This title was for life only and became extinct at her death in 1650.

A new Rivers barony, held by the family of Pitt and its later representative, that of Pitt-Rivers, was in existence from 1776 to 1880.

List of titleholders

Earls Rivers, first Creation (1466)
also Baron Rivers (England, 1448)
Richard Woodville, 1st Earl Rivers (1405–1469)
Anthony Woodville, 2nd Earl Rivers (–1483)
Richard Woodville, 3rd Earl Rivers (- 1491)

Earls Rivers, second Creation (1626)
Thomas Darcy, 1st Earl Rivers (1565–1640); m. Mary Kitson
also Viscount Colchester (England, 1621); Baron Darcy of Chiche (England, 1551); Baron Darcy of Chiche (England, 1613)
John Savage, 2nd Earl Rivers (–1654)
also Viscount Colchester (England, 1621); Viscount Savage (England, 1626); Baron Darcy of Chiche (England, 1613); Baronets, of Rocksavage (England, 1611)
Thomas Savage, 3rd Earl Rivers (–1694)
Richard Savage, 4th Earl Rivers (–1712)
John Savage, 5th Earl Rivers (1665–1737)

Earl Rivers, third Creation (1641)
Elizabeth Savage, Countess Rivers (1581–1650)
also Viscountess Colchester (England, 1641); both titles for life.

References

Extinct earldoms in the Peerage of England
Noble titles created in 1466
Noble titles created in 1626
Noble titles created in 1641
Peerages created with special remainders